Operace Silver A  is a Czech drama film directed by Jiří Strach, based on the military operation of the same name. It was released in 2007.

Cast
 Klára Issová – Hana Kroupová
 Tatiana Vilhelmová – Tána Hladíková
 Jiří Dvořák – Alfréd Bartos
 Ivan Trojan – Frantisek Hladík
 David Švehlík – Václav Kroupa
 Miroslav Táborský – Arnost Kostál
 Aleš Háma – Josef Valcík
 Matěj Hádek – Jirí Potucek
 Marek Taclík – Hubert Freylach
 Viktor Preiss – Wilhelm Schultze
 Jan Vondráček – Gerhard Clages
 Jana Hlaváčová – Nohýnková
 Taťjana Medvecká – Andela
 Alois Švehlík – Kroupa
 Dana Syslová – Kroupová

External links
 

2007 films
2007 drama films
2000s Czech-language films
Czech war drama films
Czech resistance to Nazi occupation in film
Czech television films
Czech Television original films
2000s war drama films
Czech World War II films
Films released in separate parts
2000s Czech films
Czech films based on actual events